Mladenovac railway station is a railway station on Belgrade–Niš railway. Located in Mladenovac, Belgrade, Serbia. Located in the settlement Mladenovac in the municipality of Mladenovac. Railroad continued to Kovačevac in one, and Sopot Kosmajski in the another direction.  Mladenovac railway station consists of six railway tracks.

See also 
 Serbian Railways
 Beovoz
 BG Voz

References 

Railway stations in Belgrade
Mladenovac